Youth Mass are an Alternative rock band from Meath, Ireland formed in 2010. The  line up is composed of Darren Mullarkey (vocals, guitar), Neil Nevins (guitar), Barry Mullarkey (bass, vocals), Gavin Mulhall (guitar, vocals) and William "Willy" Gray (drums).

History (2010-2014) 
Youth Mass formed when Neil Nevins & William "Willy" Gray formed the band in 2010, they quickly approached Darren Mullarkey and Cathal Gantley to form the first line up of the band.

They released their début EP "Misanthropy" in 2010. Their début album "Morning Run, Evening Sun", released on 4 April 2014, reached number 56 in the Irish Albums Chart.

Band members
 Current members
 Darren Mullarkey – Lead vocals, rhythm guitar (2010–present)
 Neil Nevins – Lead guitar (2010–present)
 Barry Mullarkey – Bass, vocals (2012–present)
 Gavin Mulhall - Lead guitar, vocals (2016–present)
 William "Willy" Gray - Drums, percussion (2010–present)

Former members
 Cathal Gantley – bass, backing vocals (2010–2011)
 Gerry Ryan – bass, backing vocals (2011–2012)

Discography

Studio albums

EPs

See also
 Irish rock
 Music of Ireland

References

External links
 

2010 establishments in Ireland
Irish alternative rock groups
Irish rock music groups
Musical groups established in 2010
Musical quartets
Musical groups from County Meath